Wang Hao (born 28 November 1966) is a male Chinese former international table tennis player.

He won a gold medal at the 1987 World Table Tennis Championships in the men's team, a bronze medal at the 1987 World Table Tennis Championships in the mixed doubles with Guan Jianhua and a silver medal at the 1993 World Table Tennis Championships in the men's team.

See also
 List of table tennis players
 List of World Table Tennis Championships medalists

References

Chinese male table tennis players
Table tennis players from Baoding
Living people
1966 births
World Table Tennis Championships medalists